Bolles is a surname. Notable people with the surname include:

Charles Bolles, alias Black Bart, American outlaw
Don Bolles, Arizona journalist murdered in 1976 after investigating the Mafia
Don Bolles (musician), drummer for the Germs
Garett Bolles, American football player
Richard "Dicky" J. Bolles (1843-1917), Florida land speculator 
Richard Nelson Bolles, author of What Color Is Your Parachute?
Robert C. Bolles (1928–1994), psychologist
Stephen Bolles (1866–1941), congressman from Wisconsin
John Savage Bolles (1905–1983), San Francisco architect

See also
Bolles baronets, list of Bolles baronets titles
The Bolles School, a private college preparatory school in Jacksonville, Florida
Bolles+Wilson, an architecture firm